The Tomb of Two Kamals, or in short the 2-Kamal Tomb, is a funerary monument  in Tabriz, Iran. Two Kamals – the 14th-century poet Kamal Khujandi and the 15th-century miniaturist Kamaleddin Behzad – are buried in an underground chamber: visitors descend about 10 steps to see the two tombs. There are also statues of the two Kamals near the tomb.

Buildings and structures in Tabriz
Tombs in Iran
Tourist attractions in Tabriz